John Clarey (born 4 October 1940) is a British former racing cyclist.

Cycling career
He represented England in the 10 miles scratch race at the 1962 British Empire and Commonwealth Games in Perth, Western Australia, despite being hospitalised a few days earlier when training for the event at the velodrome. 

Four years later he was selected to represent England again at the 1966 British Empire and Commonwealth Games in Kingston, Jamaica where he participated in the road race.

He was the national 10 miles champion but finished in last place in the 1968 Tour de France.

Major results

1961
1st Stage 12 Milk Race
1962
1st Stage 2 Milk Race
Commonwealth Games, Track, 10 Mile
1963
2nd British National Road Race Amateurs
1964
3rd British National Road Race Amateurs
1966
1st Lincoln Grand Prix
1968
63rd Tour de France

References

External links

1940 births
Living people
British male cyclists
People from Woolwich
Cyclists from Greater London
Commonwealth Games medallists in cycling
Commonwealth Games bronze medallists for England
Cyclists at the 1962 British Empire and Commonwealth Games
Cyclists at the 1966 British Empire and Commonwealth Games
Medallists at the 1962 British Empire and Commonwealth Games